Caroline Spahni (born 4 May 1982) is a Swiss former bobsledder who has competed since 2007. She finished 12th in the two-woman event at the 2010 Winter Olympics in Vancouver.

Spahni's best World Cup finish was sixth in the two-woman event at St. Moritz in January 2010.

She retired from competition at the end of the 2013-14 season.

References

 

1982 births
Living people
Swiss female bobsledders
Bobsledders at the 2010 Winter Olympics
Olympic bobsledders of Switzerland